Fencing at the 2018 Asian Games was held at Jakarta Convention Center, Jakarta, Indonesia, from 19 to 24 August 2018.

Schedule

Medalists

Men

Women

Medal table

Participating nations
A total of 279 athletes from 25 nations competed in fencing at the 2018 Asian Games:

References

External links
 Fencing at the 2018 Asian Games
Official Result Book – Fencing

 
2018
2018 Asian Games events
Asian Games